A nosebleed, also known as epistaxis, is an instance of bleeding from the nose. Blood can flow down into the stomach, and cause nausea and vomiting. In more severe cases, blood may come out of both nostrils. Rarely, bleeding may be so significant that low blood pressure occurs. Blood may also come up the nasolacrimal duct and out from the eye.

Risk factors include trauma, including putting the finger in the nose, blood thinners, high blood pressure, alcoholism, seasonal allergies, dry weather, and inhaled corticosteroids. There are two types: anterior, which is more common; and posterior, which is less common but more serious. Anterior nosebleeds generally occur from Kiesselbach's plexus while posterior bleeds generally occur from the sphenopalatine artery. The diagnosis is by direct observation.

Prevention may include the use of petroleum jelly in the nose. Initially, treatment is generally the application of pressure for at least five minutes over the lower half of the nose. If this is not sufficient, nasal packing may be used. Tranexamic acid may also be helpful. If bleeding episodes continue, endoscopy is recommended.

About 60% of people have a nosebleed at some point in their life. About 10% of nosebleeds are serious. Nosebleeds are rarely fatal, accounting for only 4 of the 2.4 million deaths in the U.S. in 1999. Nosebleeds most commonly affect those younger than 10 and older than 50.

Cause 

Nosebleeds can occur due to a variety of reasons. Some of the most common causes include trauma from nose picking, blunt trauma (such as a motor vehicle accident), or insertion of a foreign object (more likely in children). Relative humidity (including centrally heated buildings), respiratory tract infections, chronic sinusitis, rhinitis or environmental irritants can cause inflammation and thinning of the tissue in the nose, leading to a greater likelihood of bleeding from the nose.

Most causes of nose bleeding are self-limiting and do not require medical attention. However, if nosebleeds are recurrent or do not respond to home therapies, an underlying cause may need to be investigated. Some rarer causes are listed below:

Coagulopathy

Thrombocytopenia (thrombotic thrombocytopenic purpura, idiopathic thrombocytopenic purpura)
 Von Willebrand's disease
 Hemophilia
 Leukemia
HIV
 Chronic liver disease—cirrhosis causes deficiency of factor II, VII, IX,& X

Dietary

Sulfur dioxide (sulphur dioxide) E220 (as a food preservative used particularly in wines, dried fruits, etc. )
Sulphites as food preservatives
Salicylates naturally occurring in some fruits and vegetables

Inflammatory

Granulomatosis with polyangiitis
Systemic lupus erythematosus

Medications/Drugs

Anticoagulation (warfarin, heparin, aspirin, etc.)
 Insufflated drugs (particularly cocaine)
 Nasal sprays (particularly prolonged or improper use of nasal steroids)

Neoplastic

Squamous cell carcinoma
Adenoid cystic carcinoma
Melanoma
Nasopharyngeal carcinoma 
Nasopharyngeal angiofibroma
Nosebleeds can be a sign of cancer in the sinus area, which is rare, or tumors starting at the base of the brain, such as meningioma. Due to the sensitive location, nosebleeds caused by tumors are typically associated with other symptoms, such as hearing or vision problems.

Traumatic

Anatomical deformities (e.g. septal spurs)
Blunt trauma (usually a sharp blow to the face such as a punch, sometimes accompanying a nasal fracture)
Foreign bodies (such as fingers during nose-picking)
Digital trauma
Middle ear barotrauma (such as from descent in aircraft or ascent in scuba diving)
Nasal bone fracture
 Septal fracture/perforation
Surgery (e.g. septoplasty and functional endoscopic sinus surgery)
Nasal bleeds may be due to fracture of facial bones namely maxilla and zygoma.

Vascular

 Hereditary hemorrhagic telangiectasia (Osler–Weber–Rendu disease)
Angioma
Aneurysm of the carotid artery

Pathophysiology 

The nasal mucosa contains a rich blood supply that can be easily ruptured and cause bleeding. Rupture may be spontaneous or initiated by trauma. Nosebleeds are reported in up to 60% of the population with peak incidences in those under the age of ten and over the age of 50 and appear to occur in males more than females. An increase in blood pressure (e.g. due to general hypertension) tends to increase the duration of spontaneous epistaxis. Anticoagulant medication and disorders of blood clotting can promote and prolong bleeding. Spontaneous epistaxis is more common in the elderly as the nasal mucosa (lining) becomes dry and thin and blood pressure tends to be higher. The elderly are also more prone to prolonged nosebleeds as their blood vessels are less able to constrict and control the bleeding.

The vast majority of nosebleeds occur in the front anterior (front) part of the nose from the nasal septum. This area is richly endowed with blood vessels (Kiesselbach's plexus). This region is also known as Little's area. Bleeding farther back in the nose is known as a posterior bleed and is usually due to bleeding from Woodruff's plexus, a venous plexus situated in the posterior part of inferior meatus. Posterior bleeds are often prolonged and difficult to control. They can be associated with bleeding from both nostrils and with a greater flow of blood into the mouth.

 Sometimes blood flowing from other sources of bleeding passes through the nasal cavity and exits the nostrils. It is thus blood coming from the nose but is not a true nosebleed, that is, not truly originating from the nasal cavity. Such bleeding is called "pseudoepistaxis" (pseudo + epistaxis). Examples include blood coughed up through the airway and ending up in the nasal cavity, then dripping out.

Prevention

People with uncomplicated nosebleeds can use conservative methods to prevent future nosebleeds such as sleeping in a humidified environment or applying petroleum jelly to the nasal nares.

Treatment 
Most anterior nosebleeds can be stopped by applying direct pressure, which helps by promoting blood clots. Those who have a nosebleed should first attempt to blow out any blood clots and then apply pressure for at least five minutes and up to 20 minutes. Pressure should be firm and tilting the head forward helps decrease the chance of nausea and airway obstruction as seen in the picture on the right. When attempting to stop a nosebleed at home, the head should not be tilted back. Swallowing excess blood can irritate the stomach and cause vomiting. Vasoconstrictive medications such as oxymetazoline (Afrin) or phenylephrine are widely available over the counter for treatment of allergic rhinitis and may also be used to control benign cases of epistaxis. Those with nosebleeds that last longer than 20 minutes (in the setting of direct pressure as seen in the image to the right) should seek medical attention.

Nasal packing
If pressure and chemical cauterization cannot stop bleeding, nasal packing is the mainstay of treatment. There are several forms of nasal packing that can be contrasted by anterior nasal packing and posterior nasal packing. Traditionally, nasal packing was accomplished by packing gauze into the nose, thereby placing pressure on the vessels in the nose and stopping the bleeding. Traditional gauze packing has been replaced with products such as Merocel and the Rapid Rhino. The Merocel nasal tampon is similar to gauze packing except it is a synthetic foam polymer (made of polyvinyl alcohol and expands in the nose after application of water) that provides a less hospitable medium for bacteria. The Rapid Rhino stops nosebleeds using a balloon catheter, made of carboxymethylcellulose, which has a cuff that is inflated by air to stop bleeding through extra pressure in the nasal cavity. Systematic review articles have demonstrated that the efficacy in stopping nosebleeds is similar between the Rapid Rhino and Merocel packs; however, the Rapid Rhino has been shown to have greater ease of insertion and reduced discomfort. People who receive nasal packing need to return to a medical professional in 24–72 hours in order to have packing removed. There are also several dissolvable packing materials that stop bleeding through use of thrombotic agents that promote blood clots, such as surgicel. The thrombogenic foams and gels do not require removal and dissolve after a few days. Posterior nasal packing can be achieved by using a Foley catheter, blowing up the balloon when it is in the back of the throat, and applying traction. Complications of nasal packing include abscesses, septal hematomas, sinusitis, and pressure necrosis. In rare cases toxic shock syndrome can occur with prolonged nasal packing. As a result, many forms of nasal packing involve use of topical antistaphylococcal antibiotic ointment.

Tranexamic acid 
Tranexamic acid helps promote blood clotting. For nosebleeds it can be applied to the site of bleeding, taken by mouth, or injected into a vein.

Cauterization
This method involves applying a chemical such as silver nitrate to the nasal mucosa, which burns and seals off the bleeding. Eventually the nasal tissue to which the chemical is applied will undergo necrosis. This form of treatment is best for mild bleeds, especially in children, that are clearly visible. A topical anesthetic (such as lidocaine) is usually applied prior to cauterization. Silver nitrate can cause blackening of the skin due to silver sulfide deposit, though this will fade with time.

Surgery
Ongoing bleeding despite good nasal packing is a surgical emergency and can be treated by endoscopic evaluation of the nasal cavity under general anesthesia to identify an elusive bleeding point or to directly ligate (tie off) the blood vessels supplying the nose. These blood vessels include the sphenopalatine, anterior and posterior ethmoidal arteries. More rarely the maxillary or a branch of the external carotid artery can be ligated. The bleeding can also be stopped by intra-arterial embolization using a catheter placed in the groin and threaded up the aorta to the bleeding vessel by an interventional radiologist. There is no difference in outcomes between embolization and ligation as treatment options, but embolization is considerably more expensive. Continued bleeding may be an indication of more serious underlying conditions.

Other
The utility of local cooling of the head and neck is controversial. Some state that applying ice to the nose or forehead is not useful. Others feel that it may promote vasoconstriction of the nasal blood vessels and thus be useful. In Indonesian traditional medicine, betel leaf is used to stop nosebleeds as it contains tannin which causes blood to coagulate, thus stopping active bleeding.

Society and culture
In the visual language of Japanese manga and anime, nosebleeding often indicates that the bleeding person is sexually aroused. In Western fiction, nosebleeds often signify intense mental focus or effort, particularly during the use of psychic powers.

In American and Canadian usage, "nosebleed section" and "nosebleed seats" are common slang for seating at sporting or other spectator events that are the highest up and farthest away from the event. The reference alludes to the propensity for nasal hemorrhage at high altitudes, usually owing to lower barometric pressure.

The oral history of the Native American Sioux tribe includes reference to women who experience nosebleeds as a result of a lover's playing of music, implying sexual arousal.

In the Finnish language, "picking blood from one's nose" and "begging for a nosebleed" are commonly used in abstract meaning to describe self-destructive behaviour, for example ignoring safety procedures or deliberately aggravating stronger parties.

In Filipino slang, to "have a nosebleed" is to have serious difficulty conversing in English with a fluent or native English speaker. It can also refer to anxiety brought on by a stressful event such as an examination or a job interview.

In the Dutch language, "pretending to have a nosebleed" is a saying that means pretending not to know anything about something.

Etymology
The word epistaxis is from  epistazo, "to bleed from the nose" from  epi, "above, over" and  stazo, "to drip [from the nostrils]".

References

External links 

Bleeding
First aid
Nose disorders
Wikipedia medicine articles ready to translate
Symptoms and signs: Respiratory system